Operation Chenla II or Chenla Two was a major military operation conducted by the Khmer National Armed Forces (FANK) during the Cambodian Civil War from 20 August until 3 December 1971.

Background
During the days of Prince Norodom Sihanouk's rule in Cambodia in the 1960s, the People's Army of Vietnam (PAVN) and their Viet Cong (VC) allies were able to use base areas in Cambodian territory in order to provide logistical support for their combat troops within South Vietnam. Following the March 1970 coup led by the pro-U.S. General Lon Nol, the PAVN aggressively expanded their control over the provinces of northeastern Cambodia, coming dangerously close to the capital Phnom Penh.

Initially, the small, largely untrained and poorly-equipped FANK was not up to the challenge, especially against the larger and more experienced PAVN/VC forces. However, by the summer of 1971, and with massive American and South Vietnamese assistance, the FANK grew into a force of more than one-hundred thousand men.

During the period between September 1970 and June 1971, the FANK won its first victories after they successfully dislodged elements of the PAVN 9th Division along Route 13 and in some parts of the Mekong Delta.

By April 1971, Marshal Lon Nol decided to renew the offensive against the PAVN/VC forces, taking advantage of the high morale among the FANK troops following the partial success of Operation Chenla I. For the FANK everything was at stake, as many reserves and prestige were invested in the operation. The FANK High Command's main objective was to reopen all of Route 6 and to secure the road between Kampong Cham and the isolated garrison at Kampong Thom. A FANK task-force of ten infantry battalions – again including a large percentage of Khmer Krom troops – gathered into three brigade groups supported by armour and artillery was assembled for the operation, which relied heavily on U.S. air support to soften an estimated two PAVN divisions in the region.

Operation
Operation Chenla II was launched on 20 August 1971, again catching the PAVN/VC by surprise. Initially, the FANK task-force commanded by Brigadier-General Hou Hang Sin achieved their objective, as the FANK were able to retake Barai on 26 August and Kompong Thmar on 1 September. But as FANK formations were advancing towards PAVN/VC-held territory along Route 6, they were heavily exposed to attacks without adequate protection from their flanks. There was heavy fighting as the FANK 5th Brigade Group advanced towards Phnom Santuk while Tang Krasang was retaken on 20 September. On 5 October, three FANK brigades were committed to capture the areas around Phnom Santuk. The fighting there grew in intensity as the Cambodians and the PAVN engaged in heavy hand-to-hand combat. Phnom Santuk was eventually retaken, and the first phase of Chenla II was declared officially concluded on 25 October, although real military success had not yet been secured.

Victory celebrations had hardly started at Phnom Penh when on the night of 26 October, barely hours upon the conclusion of the consolidation efforts of the second phase of the operation, the PAVN 9th Division, reinforced by the VC 205th and 207th Regional Regiments, launched an all-out assault on the Cambodian positions located along Route 6 from the Chamkar Andong rubber plantation. At the same time, the FANK 14th Battalion at Rumlong was encircled and isolated. During the following days, the 118th, 211th and 377th Battalions were forced to retreat to Tang Kauk, while the 61st Infantry Brigade pulled back to Treal, held by the 22nd Battalion.

The FANK launched an unsuccessful counter-attack on 27 October, and the Cambodian corridor along Route 6 was crushed by PAVN/VC troops after weeks of heavy fighting. Elements of the PAVN 9th Division then launched a final attack which ripped apart several FANK and Khmer Krom battalions, causing the disorganized Cambodian troops to abandon several key positions on 1 December. The operation was terminated two days later.

Aftermath
For the PAVN/VC forces the battle ended with a decisive victory, as they were able to secure their strongholds in northeastern Cambodia without having to expand their control inside Cambodian territory. On 8 December 1971, North Vietnamese propaganda boasted that "By October, that is, in two months, the operation was stalemated and 4,500 enemy troops were annihilated and hundreds more captured. The 2nd and 43d Brigades were badly battered. Ten battalions and seven companies of infantry and a tank company were mauled, 39 combat vessels were sunk or set afire, nine aircraft were downed and seven 105mm artillery pieces, many vehicles and large quantities of military equipment were destroyed".2 The official PAVN history claims that 10,000 enemy troops were killed or dispersed and 4,700 weapons captured.

Indeed, the final attack on FANK positions during the month of December virtually wiped out ten infantry battalions (including the sacrifice of the best Khmer Krom battalions) and resulted in the loss of another ten battalions-worth of equipment, which included two howitzers, four tanks, five armoured personnel carriers, one scout car, ten jeeps, and about two dozen other vehicles. Militarily and psychologically, the damage suffered during Operation Chenla II was a big one from which the Cambodians would never recover. From then on, the Republican government focused on consolidating its hold over the key urban centers, the main garrisons and the lower Mekong-Bassac river corridors, thus leaving most of the countryside virtually open to Khmer Rouge recruiting drives.

See also
 Battle of Kampot
 Cambodian Civil War
 Khmer National Armed Forces
 Khmer Rouge
 Weapons of the Cambodian Civil War

References

Bibliography
John S. Bowman, The Vietnam War, Day by Day, Mallard Books, New York 1989. 
Sak Sutsakhan, The Khmer Republic at War and the Final Collapse, U.S. Army Center of Military History, Washington D.C. 1980. – available online at Part 1Part 2Part 3 Part 4.
Royal College Of Defence Studies 1975 Course – The War in Cambodia Its Causes And Military Development And The Political History Of The Khmer Republic 1970 – 1975.

External links
1-FANK Order of the Day, 5 October 1971
2-Quan Doi Nhan Dan On Blows to Nixon's Khmerization Scheme

Chenla II
Chenla II
1971 in Cambodia
Chenla II
Military history of Cambodia
Chenla II
Chenla II